Title 15 is the portion of the Code of Federal Regulations that governs Commerce and Foreign Trade within the United States.  It is available in digital or printed form.

Title 15 comprises three volumes, and is divided into four Subtitles:
 Subtitle A — Office of the Secretary of Commerce
 Subtitle B — Regulations Relating to Commerce and Foreign Trade
 Subtitle C — Regulations Relating to Foreign Trade Agreements
 Subtitle D — Regulations Relating to Telecommunications and Information

Subtitle A: Office of the Secretary of Commerce
Subtitle A (§§ 0-29) covers regulations associated with the office of the U.S. Secretary of Commerce, and is primarily concerned with conduct of, restrictions on, and disciplinary proceedings concerning employees of that office.  Subtitle A occupies a portion of volume 1.

Subtitle B: Regulations Relating to Commerce and Foreign Trade
Subtitle B covers Regulations Relating to Commerce and Foreign Trade.  It begins in volume 1 and continues through volume 3.  Subtitle B consists of the following chapters:

Subtitle C: Regulations Relating to Foreign Trade Agreements
Subtitle C (§§ 2000–2099) comprises regulations relating to foreign trade agreements administered by the Office of the United States Trade Representative.  Subtitle C occupies a portion of volume 3.

Subtitle D: Regulations Relating to Telecommunications and Information
Subtitle D (§§ 2300–2399) comprises regulations relating to the National Telecommunications and Information Administration (Department of Commerce) and concludes volume 3.

External links

 Title 15 of the Code of Federal Regulations

 15
United States trade law
United States communications regulation
Special economic zones of the United States